Jevremović is a Serbian surname. Notable people with the surname include:

Branislav Jevremović (born 1970), Serbian tennis coach
Zorica Jevremović Munitić (born 1948), Serbian theatre and video director, playwright, choreographer, intermedia theorist, literary historian and feminist

Serbian surnames
Patronymic surnames